Larry Lindo (born 31 January 1943) is a Bermudian sailor. He competed in the 470 event at the 1976 Summer Olympics.

References

External links
 

1943 births
Living people
Bermudian male sailors (sport)
Olympic sailors of Bermuda
Sailors at the 1976 Summer Olympics – 470
Place of birth missing (living people)